Ōtūmoetai School (More commonly known as Ōtūmoetai Primary School) is a school in the city of Tauranga, in northern New Zealand.  The school was opened in 1895, and was the first to open in the area.  The current principal is Zara McIndoe (2019- ) and the school had 513 students in 2007.

References

Educational institutions established in 1912
Primary schools in New Zealand
Schools in Tauranga
1912 establishments in New Zealand